This is a list of countries by oil consumption.
In 2020 total worldwide oil consumption is expected to drop by 9% year over year compared to 2019 due to the COVID-19 pandemic according to the International Energy Agency (IEA).

See also
 Peak oil

References 

Energy-related lists by country
Consumption
List of countries by oil consumption
Energy consumption